Sarbisheh (also Romanized as Sarbīsheh and Sar-bice) is a city in and the capital of Sarbisheh County, South Khorasan Province, Iran. At the 2006 census, its population was 6,141, in 1,553 families.

References 

Populated places in Sarbisheh County

Cities in South Khorasan Province